Lamona is an unincorporated community located in southern Lincoln County, Washington, United States, between Odessa and Harrington on State Route 28.

Lamona was named for its first merchant, in 1892–1893, J.H. Lamona.

References

Unincorporated communities in Washington (state)
Unincorporated communities in Lincoln County, Washington